Roy Harrison may refer to:

 Roy Harrison, (born 1939), Irish former cricketer
 Roy M. Harrison, (born 1948), environmental chemist and professor